S. K. Subasinghe is a Sri Lankan politician and a former member of the Parliament of Sri Lanka.

References

Year of birth missing (living people)
Living people
Members of the 12th Parliament of Sri Lanka
Members of the 13th Parliament of Sri Lanka
Janatha Vimukthi Peramuna politicians
United People's Freedom Alliance politicians